Claire Richardson (born 2 April 1984) is a former rugby union player. She represented  internationally and provincially for Otago and Hawke's Bay. She was in the squad that won the 2006 Rugby World Cup.

Richardson made her international debut for the Black Ferns on 4 October 2003 against a World XV's team at Auckland. She made her last appearance for the Black Ferns on 17 August 2014 against the United States at the World Cup in Paris.

Richardson scored a hat-trick against hosts, Canada, at the 2006 Rugby World Cup when the Black Ferns ran in ten tries in their 66–7 victory.

References

External links
Black Ferns Profile

1984 births
Living people
New Zealand women's international rugby union players
New Zealand female rugby union players
Female rugby union players
People from Wairoa
Rugby union players from the Hawke's Bay Region